Marci Zaroff coined and trademarked the term "ECOfashion" in 1995 and is an   ECOlifestyle entrepreneur, educator, and innovatora.  She believes that Millennials are "“driving the rapidly growing movement for sustainable and ethical fashion.”    

Zaroff is an RSA Fellow and a Henry Crown Fellow of The Aspen Institute

Career 
Marci Zaroff has a degree from the Haas Business School of the University of California, Berkeley.  

 Founder/CEO of MetaWear
 Founder/CEO of ECOfashion Corp 
 Co-Founder and Chief Visionary Officer of BeyondBrands Conscious Consulting Agency
 Co-Founder and CMO of  Good Catch Foods
 Co-Founder of The Institute for Integrative Nutrition 
 Founder and former CEO/President of Under the Canopy
 Former President of  Portico Brands
 Co-Creator of I AM Enlightened Creations.
 Producer of “THREAD | Driving Fashion Forward,” documentary
 Author of "ECOrenaissance: Co-Creating A Stylish, Sexy and Sustainable World", published in 2018 by Simon & Schuster. 

Zaroff was a key figure in the development of the Global Organic Textile Standard (GOTS) and first Fair Trade Textile Certification. She is currently a Director/Advisor on several Boards, including Organic Trade Association, Textile Exchange, Fair Trade USA, Fashion Revolution, Fashion Positive, Teens Turning Green.

Zaroff has launched organic/sustainable fiber initiatives in retailers such as Whole Foods Market, Macy's, Target, Bed Bath & Beyond and AVEDA.

Business accomplishments 
 Retail Touchpoint's "Retail Innovator Award"
 ABC News' "Legends and Legacies"
 New York Moves "Power Woman Award"
 Fashion Group International's "Rising Star Award"
 ELLE Magazine's "Mercury Style Award"
 Turkish Textile Association "Honorary Member"
 National Product Industry's "Socially Responsible Business Award"

Personal life 
Zaroff lives in New York City with her husband, Eric Schnell, and her two children.

References 

Haas School of Business alumni
Henry Crown Fellows
Living people
Year of birth missing (living people)